The State Railways and Seaports Administration or DDYL was a state-owned railway company formed in 1927 by the merger of three state-owned railways: the Anatolian Baghdad Railways, Eastern Railway and the Railway Construction and Management Administration. The DDL is the direct predecessor to the Turkish State Railways.

The DDYL inherited  of railway lines from its three predecessors and at the same time, the railway was responsible for the construction of new lines, the most important one being the extension of the railway from Kayseri to Sivas. On 4 June 1929, the Turkish government formed the State Railways Administration (DDY) which absorbed the State Railways and Seaports Administration.

References

Railway companies established in 1927
Companies based in Ankara
1929 disestablishments in Turkey
Railway companies disestablished in 1929
Railway companies of Turkey
Turkish companies established in 1927